This is a list of radio stations in Central Luzon, Philippines.

Aurora

AM Stations
There are no AM Station in Aurora

FM Stations

Bataan

AM Stations
There are no AM Station in Bataan

FM Stations

Bulacan

AM Stations
There are no AM stations originating from the province of Bulacan; however, AM radio stations in Metro Manila are being relayed to the stations' transmitter sites situated elsewhere in the province.

FM Stations

Nueva Ecija

AM Stations

FM Stations

Pampanga

AM Stations

FM Stations

Tarlac

AM Stations

FM Stations

Zambales

AM Stations

FM Stations

Defunct Radio Station

FM Station

AM Station

References

Central Luzon
Radio stations